Simplehuman is a privately owned designer and manufacturer of kitchen, bath, and beauty tools based in Torrance, California.  Simplehuman's trash cans, touch-free soap pumps, shower caddies, and magnified sensor-activated vanity mirrors are sold across the US and internationally both on its website and at various brick-and-mortar retail chains such as Bed Bath & Beyond, The Container Store, Crate & Barrel, Nordstrom, and Neiman Marcus.

History
In 2000, Simplehuman was founded by Frank Yang, who immigrated to the United States in 1982 and later started the company with the idea of making a better trash can. He showed his design and received his first orders at the International Home and Housewares Show from retailers such as The Container Store and Bed Bath & Beyond. The company was originally called Canworks due to its focus on trash cans, but Yang changed the name to Simplehuman in 2001 when the company began to broaden its product line into other kitchen and bath tools, such as touch-free sensor pumps and shower caddies, under the tagline “Tools for Efficient Living”. In 2003, Simplehuman opened a UK subsidiary in Oxfordshire, England, to serve the European market.

Using sensor technology and the idea of touch-free operation, Simplehuman introduced its first sensor soap pump in 2007. In 2010, it came out with the first of its line of motion-sensor-activated trash cans. In 2013, the company took this sensor technology into the beauty tools market with the introduction of its first sensor-activated vanity mirror that uses LED light technology.

Products
Simplehuman focuses on five main product lines:
 Trash cans and liners
 Sensor pumps and soap
 Dishracks and other kitchen tools
 Shower caddies & other bath tools
 Sensor mirrors

Awards
Simplehuman's products and designs have won numerous prestigious awards including:
 The Housewares Design Award in 2013 for the semi-round sensor can
 The European Consumer Choice Awards in 2011 for the steel frame dishrack
 The European Consumer Choice Awards in 2012 for the butterfly sensor can

References

External links
Official website
UK website
Canadian website
French Canadian website
French website
German Website

Companies established in 2000
Companies based in Torrance, California